Abacetus minusculus is a species of ground beetle in the subfamily Pterostichinae. It was described by Straneo in 1938.

References

minusculus
Beetles described in 1938